Oscar Bettison (born 19 September 1975) is a British/American composer known for large-scale chamber and large ensemble works. He has been described as possessing "a unique voice". His work has been described as having "An unconventional lyricism and a menacing beauty" and "pulsating with an irrepressible energy and vitality, as well as brilliant craftsmanship." He is a member of the composition faculty at the Peabody Institute. Bettison has recently been named a 2017 Guggenheim Fellow by the John Simon Guggenheim Foundation.

Early life and education
Bettison was born in Jersey to a British father and a Spanish/Catalan mother. He started playing and composing music at an early age and, at the age of nine joined the Purcell School in London. After completing an undergraduate at the Royal College of Music with Simon Bainbridge, he studied with Robert Saxton at the Guildhall School of Music and Drama for his Master's. In 2000, he went to the Royal Conservatory of The Hague to study with Louis Andriessen and Martijn Padding, something which Bettison describes as a "formative experience." He stayed on in The Hague to complete another Master's degree and then went to Princeton University for his PhD studying with Steven Mackey. He has been the recipient of a number of awards including a 2018 Fromm Commission, Chamber Music America Commissioning Award (2013), the Yvar Mikhashoff Commissioning Fund Prize (2009), a Jerwood Foundation Award (1998), the Royal Philharmonic Society Prize (1997), the first BBC Young Composer of the Year Prize (1993) as well as fellowships to both the Tanglewood and Aspen music festivals. Since 2009, he has served on the composition department of Peabody Institute. His music is published by Boosey & Hawkes.

Selected works

O Death (2005–07) for ensemble
B & E (with aggravated assault) (2006) for ensemble
Gauze Vespers (2008) for ensemble
The Afflicted Girl (2010) for ensemble
Apart (2012) for percussion 
Livre des Sauvages (2012) for large ensemble
An Automated Sunrise (for Joseph Cornell) (2014) for ensemble
Threaded Madrigals (2014) for solo viola
Sea Shaped (2014) for Orchestra
String Quartet (2015)
Presence of Absence (2016) for mezzo soprano and large ensemble
Pale Icons of Night (2018) for violin and ensemble 
Remaking a Forest (2019) for Orchestra

References

External links
Oscar Bettison's page at Boosey & Hawkes biography, works list, recordings and performance search.
Oscar Bettison's Peabody Institute faculty profile video 
Oscar Bettison on Livre des Savages
Oscar Bettison interview on Composition Today
Oscar Bettison on New Music Box
Oscar Bettison interview on The Huffington Post
Oscar Bettison's Profile at the John Simon Guggenheim Foundation
Oscar Bettison's Official Website

1975 births
Living people
British people of Catalan descent
British people of Spanish descent
Jersey musicians
American people of Catalan descent
British emigrants to the United States
Royal Conservatory of The Hague alumni
Alumni of the Guildhall School of Music and Drama
Alumni of the Royal College of Music
Peabody Institute faculty
Princeton University alumni